Dasia vittata, the Borneo skink or striped tree skink, is a species of lizard endemic to Borneo. It is oviparous and arboreal.

References

vittata
Endemic fauna of Borneo
Reptiles of Brunei
Reptiles of Indonesia
Reptiles of Malaysia
Reptiles described in 1865
Taxa named by Abraham Carel J. Edeling
Reptiles of Borneo